Pizza arrived in the United States in the early 20th century along with waves of Italian immigrants who settled primarily in the large cities of the Northeast. It got a boost both in popularity and regional spread after soldiers stationed in Italy returned from World War II.

During the latter half of the 20th century, pizza became an iconic dish of considerable acceptance in the United States. Numerous regional variations have evolved, with many bearing only a casual resemblance to the Italian original. It is a popular fast food item produced by several pizza chains. The United States pizza restaurant industry was worth $37 billion in 2015.

History 
The first pizzeria in the U.S., Lombardi's, opened in New York City's Little Italy in 1905, producing a Neapolitan-style pizza.

Distinct regional types developed in the 20th century, including Buffalo, California, Chicago, Detroit, Greek, New Haven, New York, and St. Louis styles. These regional variations include deep-dish, stuffed, pockets, turnovers, rolls, and pizza-on-a-stick, each with several combinations of sauce and toppings.

Thirteen percent of the United States population consumes pizza on any given day. Tens of thousands of pizzerias, food stands, chains such as Domino's, Pizza Hut, and Papa John's, pies from take and bake shops, and chilled or frozen pizzas from supermarkets make pizza readily available both to diners and at-home consumers nationwide.

Ingredients

Common toppings for pizza in the United States include pepperoni, mushrooms, olives, onions, peppers, sausage, ground beef, bacon, chicken, ham, pineapple, salami, spinach, tomatoes, and anchovies.

American pizza (particularly thin-crust) is made with a very high-gluten flour (often 13–14% protein content) of the type also used to make bagels; this allows the dough to be stretched thinly and thrown vigorously without tearing. Unlike Italian pizza, American pizza often has vegetable oil or shortening mixed into the dough. This can range from a small amount in relatively lean doughs, such as New York style, to a very large amount in some recipes for Chicago-style deep-dish dough.

While tomato sauce is virtually ubiquitous, variations such as white pizza omit it while others replace it with garlic and olive oil or sauces made from other vegetables such as pesto.

Variations 
Altoona-style is a distinct type of pizza created in the city of Altoona, Pennsylvania, by the Altoona Hotel. The definitive characteristics of Altoona-style pizza are a sicilian-style pizza dough, tomato sauce, sliced green bell pepper, salami, topped with american cheese and pizzas cut into squares instead of wedges.
 Bar pizza, also known as tavern pizza and sometimes Milwaukee-style pizza, is distinguished by a thin crust, almost cracker-like, and is baked, or at least partly baked, in a shallow pan for an oily crust. Cheese covers the entire pizza, including the crust, leaving a crispy edge where the cheese meets the pan or oven surface. Bar pizzas are usually served in a bar or pub and are usually small in size (around 10" in diameter). This style of pizza is popular in the Boston area, particularly the South Shore, other parts of the northeast, the Chicago area, and the midwest.
 California-style is distinguished by the use of non-traditional ingredients, especially varieties of fresh produce. Some typical California-style toppings include Thai-inspired chicken pizza with peanut sauce, bean sprouts, and shaved carrots, taco pizzas, and pizzas with chicken and barbecue sauce as toppings.

 Chicago-style is distinguished by a thick moist crust formed up the sides of a deep-dish pan and sauce as the last ingredient, added atop the cheese and toppings. Stuffed versions have two layers of crust with the sauce on top.

 Detroit-style is a rectangular pan pizza with a thick crust that is crispy and chewy. It is traditionally topped with Wisconsin brick cheese that goes all the way to the edges and caramelizes against the high-sided heavyweight rectangular pan. This style of pizza was originally baked in rectangular steel trays designed for use as automotive drip pans or to hold small industrial parts in factories.
 Grandma pizza is a thin, square pizza, typically with cheese and tomatoes. It is reminiscent of pizzas baked at home by Italian housewives without a pizza oven, and was popularized on Long Island.
 Greek pizza is a variation popular in New England; its name comes from it being typical of the style of pizzerias owned by Greek immigrants. It has a thick, chewy crust and is baked in a pan in the pizza oven, instead of directly on the bricks. Plain olive oil is a common part of the topping, as well as being liberally used to grease the pans and crisp the crust. A significantly different variation in other parts of the country includes using feta cheese, Kalamata olives, and Greek herbs such as oregano.

Grilled pizza is made by placing a fairly thin sheet of pizza dough directly over a hot grill to brown it, then flipping it, adding toppings to the baked side, and browning the bottom. Often a large lid is placed over the pie to help capture the heat. Toppings may be sliced thin to ensure that they cook through, and denser ones such as sausage or peppers may be sauteed before being added. Garlic, herbs, or other ingredients are sometimes added to the pizza or the crust to maximize the flavor of the dish. Grilled pizza has precedents in Italy and Argentina, where it is known as pizza a la parrilla. It has become a popular cookout dish, and there are some pizza restaurants that specialize in the style. The final product can be likened to flatbread with pizza toppings.
 Minneapolis-style pizza or Minnesota-style pizza is a circular thin-crust pizza, cut into squares, with spicy sauce, and hearty toppings. It is popular in the Twin Cities metropolitan area.

 New Haven-style, has a thin crust that varies between chewy and tender (depending on where it is made), baked in coal-fired brick ovens till charred, offset by the sweetness of tomatoes and other toppings. Also known as "apizza" (pronounced as "ah-beetz" in the local dialect), it has tomato sauce and only grated Romano cheese; mozzarella is considered a topping.

 New York-style is a Neapolitan-style thin-crust pizza developed in New York City by immigrants from Naples, Italy, where pizza was created. It is traditionally hand-tossed, moderately topped with southern Italian-style marinara sauce, and liberally covered with mozzarella cheese. It is often sold in generously sized, thin, and flexible slices, typically folded in half to eat. This style of pizza tends to dominate the Northeastern states and is particularly popular in New York, New Jersey, and Connecticut. Jumbo slices of a similar pie are particularly popular in Washington, D.C.
Ohio Valley-style pizza is pizza that was developed in Steubenville, Ohio and has made its way up the Ohio River to Pittsburgh, Pennsylvania. It uses a square pizza dough that rises thick but maintains a light consistency. The crust and bottom are crunchy. The sauce on this style of pizza is typically sweet and the pizza is baked without toppings. Immediately after being removed from the oven cold toppings are put on the hot pizza, including the cheese, in prodigious amounts. Most of the cheese melts, but not all. The other toppings used remain cold on top of the cheese.
 Pan pizza - deep-dish styles like Chicago and Detroit are pan pizzas. A variation of moderate thickness was popularized by Pizza Hut.

 Quad City-style is an Iowa pizza with a thin dough that incorporates seasoning that is heavy on malt, lending a toasted, nutty flavor. The smooth, thin sauce contains both red chili flakes and ground cayenne, and is more spicy than sweet. It is topped heavily with lean, fennel-flecked Italian sausage that is ground twice and spread in crumbles from edge to edge.
 Sheet pizza is any thin-crust style baked on a baking sheet. It is typically rectangular (like the sheet) and served for events with a large number of people.
Sicilian pizza in the United States is typically a square pie with a thick crust. It is derived from Sfinciuni, a thick-crust variety from Sicily, and was introduced in the US by early Sicilian immigrants. Sicilian-style pizza is popular in Italian-American enclaves in the Northeast, Metro Detroit, and Portland, Oregon.
 St. Louis-style is a variant of thin-crust pizza popular around St. Louis and southern Illinois notable for its use of distinctive Provel cheese instead of (or, rarely, in addition to) mozzarella. Its crust is thin enough to become very crunchy in the oven, sometimes being compared to a cracker, and toppings are usually sliced instead of diced. Even though round, St. Louis-style pies are always cut into small squares.
 Tomato pie is a square-cut thick-crust pizza topped with chunky tomato sauce and sprinkled with pecorino romano cheese, very similar to Sicilian sfinciuni. Also known as party pizza, pizza strips, gravy pie, church pie, red bread, strip pizza, and bakery pizza. Popular in several areas around the Northeast, especially Rhode Island, Philadelphia and Utica, New York.
 Trenton tomato pie or New Jersey tomato pie is a circular thin-crust pizza where the cheese and toppings are placed before the sauce. Named after Trenton, New Jersey.

See also

 History of pizza
 Italian-American cuisine
 Mexican Pizza, created by the U.S.-based chain Taco Bell
 Pizza in China

References

Further reading

 Barrett, Liz. Pizza: A Slice of American History. Minneapolis, Minn.: Voyageur Press, 2014

American cuisine
 
United States